Written and illustrated by Rinko Ueda,  was originally published as a oneshot in Margaret magazine in 2001, but was soon followed by another oneshot,  in 2002, and then the series, Tail of the Moon. The Tail of the Moon manga was serialized in Margaret from 2002 until its completion in 2007. Both the prequel and the series are licensed by Viz Media in North America for an English language release as part of their Shojo Beat line of manga. Viz also previewed the series in their now-defunct Shojo Beat magazine. The series is also licensed for release in Taiwan by Sharp Point Press. Beginning in October 2010, the series is being re-released as bunko editions in Japan.

Volume List

References

Tail of the Moon